Hammer House of Horror is a British television series made in 1980. An anthology series created by Hammer Films in association with Cinema Arts International and ITC Entertainment, it consists of 13 hour-long episodes, originally broadcast on ITV.

Each self-contained episode features a different kind of horror. These vary from witches, werewolves and ghosts to devil-worship and voodoo, but also include non-supernatural horror themes such as cannibalism, confinement and serial killers. In 2003 Channel 4 placed Hammer House of Horror at No. 50 in its "100 Scariest Moments" show. The clip shown was the children's party scene in "The House That Bled to Death".

Episodes were directed by Alan Gibson, Peter Sasdy and Tom Clegg, among others, and the story editor was Anthony Read. Hammer regular Peter Cushing appears in his final Hammer production in episode 7, titled "The Silent Scream".

List of episodes

Plot summaries

1) Witching Time
Film music composer David Winter (Jon Finch) lives with his actress wife Mary (Prunella Gee) in a secluded farmhouse. David is upset because he knows Mary is having an affair with someone; unbeknownst to him this is his own psychiatrist, Dr Charles (Ian McCulloch). One night during a storm, when Mary is away, a young woman named Lucinda Jessop (Patricia Quinn) appears in the farmhouse stable. She tells David she is a witch from the 17th century and has used her powers to travel in time to the 20th century in order to escape from witch hunters who wanted to burn her at the stake at the very same farmhouse. David doesn't believe her and locks her in one of the bedrooms of the house. He calls Dr Charles who visits David but, when Lucinda has miraculously vanished from the locked room, he thinks David is simply hallucinating. After Charles leaves, Lucinda reappears and seduces David using witchcraft.

Mary initially doesn't believe David's claims either but is soon convinced that Lucinda is real when the latter begins to harass the couple repeatedly with witchcraft. She visits the local Rector (Lennard Pearce), who investigates and finds that there was a local witch named Lucinda Jessop who escaped being burnt at the stake in the year 1652 by Puritans who used to capture and execute witches by drowning or burning them. Mary then asks Dr Charles to help, but he refuses and Mary ends her affair with him. As Mary is returning home on horseback, Lucinda attacks her and she is hospitalised for several days.

Mary returns home determined to fight the witch and rescue David. She finds a voodoo doll, which Lucinda made to cause her pain. Under Lucinda's spell, and being told that his wife is unfaithful, David locks Mary in the cellar as he prepares a pyre, convinced that it is Mary who should be burnt at the stake. Mary escapes and locks David in the stable for safety, but Lucinda reappears. The two women fight, which causes the stable to catch fire. Mary tries using the voodoo doll against Lucinda by recasting it in her image, but fails. Mary throws water on Lucinda, which weakens her, as witches are afraid of water. She then drowns Lucinda in a trough. With Lucinda's spell now broken, David and Mary are reunited. David picks up the voodoo doll and throws it into the fire; Lucinda's screams are heard.

2) The Thirteenth Reunion
Magazine journalist Ruth Cairns (Julia Foster) is assigned by her editor (Dinah Sheridan) to cover an unconventional weight-loss programme at the Chesterton clinic. She enrols and there befriends Ben Faraday (Warren Clarke), also trying to lose weight, who is paradoxically advised by the program coach Mr Willis (James Cosmo) to binge eat and take certain pills. Strangely, the participants are also asked whether they ever had a Salmonella infection. Later that night, after taking his prescribed pill, Ben hallucinates while driving and dies in an accident. Ruth learns of this and is soon approached by Andrew (Gerard Kelly), who works at a local firm of funeral directors. He says Ben's body was brought there and that accidents similar to this one have occurred in the recent past, and he thinks his employers are in some way connected with them.

Ruth and Andrew investigate and find that the corpses are being replaced by mannequins for burial, and that the funeral directors are secretly taking the dismembered carcasses to Chesterton Clinic. Ruth gets permission from her editor to expose the racket and advance her career, and – using her doctor friend's help – is admitted to the clinic as a patient with a feigned diagnosis of peripheral vascular disease. There, she prowls around late at night and finds a room with several carcasses being stored like an abattoir. She sees the clinic director Jack Rothwell (Kevin Stoney) taking one of the dismembered corpses in his car, and follows him to a country mansion.

Ruth sneaks into the mansion but is discovered by Humphrey Chesterton (Richard Pearson), the owner of the mansion and Chesterton clinic. Surprisingly, she is invited to stay for a dinner party he is throwing for several guests, including Rothwell. She is told that all of the guests are survivors of a well-known plane crash that occurred just over a year ago, and that they meet regularly at the mansion to celebrate and "remember those who died", this being their thirteenth reunion. Suddenly it becomes clear to Ruth that the survivors resorted to cannibalism and ate the bodies of the dead passengers of the plane crash in order to survive until they were rescued, and they mark the occasion at each reunion by eating human flesh, and victims from the Chesterton Clinic are killed and the corpses are smuggled by the funeral directors to be eaten at these reunions. Frantically she runs to inform Andrew at the funeral home, but finds his corpse there, killed by the funeral directors after he discovered their activities. Mr Willis then appears and tells Ruth that he too was a survivor of the plane crash, before he kills her with a meat cleaver.

3) Rude Awakening
Estate agent Norman Shenley (Denholm Elliott) has an affair with secretary Lolly Fellows (Lucy Gutteridge). Shenley wants to divorce his wife Emily (Pat Heywood) and marry Lolly, but Emily does not consent. Mr Rayburn (James Laurenson) visits Shenley's office, saying he wishes to sell a desolate property named Lower Moat Manor through him. Norman visits the house, and starts to hear a voice saying "you shouldn't have killed your wife on Friday the 13th" and sees Emily's body tumbling down, after which he wakes up in bed beside his wife. Thinking it was a nightmare, Norman returns to work that morning and finds that Lolly cannot remember Mr Rayburn's visit the previous day. Shenley revisits Lower Moat Manor, but finds that the house does not exist, and when he enters a phone booth to inform Lolly, the message comes up "why did you do it", smoke emits from the telephone and chokes him. Again, he wakes up beside his wife and finds that he was having another nightmare within a nightmare. And again, neither Emily nor Lolly are able to remember him recounting these events to them before.

Shenley investigates the house a third time, and is welcomed by the ghost of old Lady Strudwick (Eleanor Summerfield), apparently the mistress of the manor house. Soon he begins to hear the same voice again saying, "you shouldn't have killed your wife", and Rayburn appears and grabs Shenley and hangs him on a noose in the house. Shenley wakes up again at home beside Emily, having had his third nightmare. Shenley and Lolly go to another apartment to discuss another sale, where they find that the place is desolate and is being demolished, with them stuck in it. Shenley runs to safety outside, and is met with by Rayburn who repeats the same sentence. Again, Shenley wakes up from a nightmare. His wife, already knowing that he has an affair with Lolly, calls the doctor, and it is revealed that he has a brain tumour, which needs emergency surgery. During the surgery, performed by Rayburn, Emily and Lolly, Shenley dies and is put in the mortuary—at which point he wakes up again beside his sleeping wife, after his fifth nightmare. He smothers Emily to death.

The story ends with Norman Shenley now rushing to his office that morning to break the 'good news' about his wife's 'departure' and desire to marry Lolly, but she is now demure and staid, and cannot understand anything being said, despite being given a valuable diamond necklace. In come the police, Rayburn one among them, who says that Emily has been found killed and that "Shenley should not have killed her". Shenley thinks it is just another nightmare, as if it was true, then his wife should have died days before on Friday the 13th, since he had already seen her corpse in his first dream. He is then told that the current date is Friday the 13th, Rayburn does not remember ever meeting him before, and Lolly cannot remember having had any affair with him, and no one understands what he is saying. The cops take him away, and a puzzled Lolly decides to leave the job immediately. The phone rings as she is leaving, and a voice identifying himself as 'Mr Rayburn' asks for Norman Shenley, saying 'he wants to sell property'. Lolly departs - and takes the necklace with her.

4) Growing Pains
William Morton, the 10-year-old son of botanist Terence Morton (Gary Bond) and his wife Laurie (Barbara Kellerman), dies after consuming a toxic chemical in his father's lab.

The Mortons then adopt another child, James, from an orphanage. However, once he goes to live with them, strange occurrences begin to happen. Laurie's car goes out of control as it passes the cemetery where William is buried, maggots appear in the Mortons' dinner, and a toy rabbit that Laurie gives to James becomes smeared with blood. There is no explanation for these events and throughout them all, James remains strangely calm and unemotional.

Terence is working on a protein supplement from a plant that he cultivated which may help to eliminate hunger in the poorer nations of the world. He is visited the next day by representatives from the organisation he hopes to sell it to, as James takes Nipper, the family's pet Rottweiler, for a walk to the cemetery. Upon reaching William's grave, a strange wind occurs and Nipper goes wild. He runs back to the house and attacks Terence's lab rabbits, and then Terence. The couple are forced to poison the dog and bury him.

That night, James finds William's diary. It describes how neglected he felt, his parents seemingly having been too busy with their work to devote any attention to him. James shows it to Laurie, who becomes increasingly distraught. Meanwhile, Nipper's howls are heard outside. William's ghost then appears to his parents in the lab, telling them how he was saddened as they neglected him in the midst of their busy schedules, prioritising work over him. He kills a valued rabbit and runs away with Terence's prized plant, the basis of his years of work. Terence chases after him, despite Laurie's warning, and they reach the cemetery. In the darkness, Terence falls into an open grave and is killed. William's ghost and the plant then disappear and Laurie finds James lying on William's grave. James awakens and asks her why they are there. They look at the gravestone, which now says Terence Morton and his beloved son William. The plant that was Terence's work is now growing on the grave in the shape of a wreath, which Laurie says is "for all the unloved of this earth", as she walks away with James.

5) The House That Bled to Death
William and Emma Peters (Nicholas Ball and Rachel Davies) move into a house with their young daughter Sophia, but are apparently unaware of its history. They are sold the house by real estate agent A.J. Powers (Milton Johns), but the house was the site of a gruesome murder when an elderly man poisoned and hacked his wife to death. Soon, strange happenings begin, with creepy noises, doors that shut and do not open, leaking gas pipes, the appearance of bloodstains on walls, and even the slaughter of Sophia's pet cat by an unknown force. Their neighbours, George and Joan Evans, do their best to help the family, even sheltering them in their house. The Peters learn about the murder case, and request the Evans not to tell anyone about the recent happenings.

Thereafter the paranormal events cease. Months later, Joan visits the family and the ghostly activities restart, forcing William to blame Joan's 'presence in the house' for it and send her away. During a children's party for Sophia's birthday, an overhead pipe breaks and blood sprays over all of the guests, triggering further panic. Emma is hospitalised with shock. William meets with Powers, who devises a plan to send the family away to 'safety'. The news reaches the media and soon the house is known as The house that bled to death, owing to its history and the recent events with the Peters. Powers uses this opportunity to write a book based on these events, which becomes a bestseller. The Evans learn that the Peters have abruptly left England, and that William and Emma were never married.

Three years later in California, William and Emma (who is revealed to actually be a single parent) are rich and living together, with Sophia who is now older. It is revealed that everything was a ploy, and the entire sequence of events were staged to deceive everyone into believing the house was haunted and they were forced to flee. Powers sells the film rights to his bestselling book, based on these 'paranormal' experiences, making himself, William and Emma even richer. However, Sophia (who was never told of the scam) has become quiet and detached and Emma worries she may have been affected by the traumatic events in the house. When Sophia reads Powers' book and then discovers the belongings of the old couple who lived in the house before them, she seemingly becomes possessed. Picking up the kukri, the murder weapon from the old house, she walks into her mother's bedroom and kills William as Emma screams in horror.

6) Charlie Boy
Jack, a wealthy elderly man, dies under mysterious circumstances, after which his nephew Graham (Leigh Lawson) arrives to claim the art collection his uncle bequeathed to him. Graham opts to sell most of the collection, but his wife Sarah (Angela Bruce) finds an African sculpture (called a 'fetish') with knives stuck in it. She nicknames it 'Charlie Boy', and takes it home with them. En route they are involved in a road rage incident and harassed by an intimidating car driver whom they nickname 'Scarface'. Back home that night, Graham is still riled by the incident and playfully sticks a knife into Charlie Boy while thinking about Scarface. Unbeknownst to him, as he does this, Scarface is actually stabbed and killed elsewhere by mobsters.

Graham's elder brother Mark (Michael Culver) inherits the bulk of their uncle's estate, including his country mansion and his money. The younger man attempts to benefit from this by negotiating a business deal with him, but – after Graham has, on the strength of the deal, resigned from his job – Mark reneges on it, and Graham feels desperate. That night, he angrily stabs a group photograph that features Mark, and then pushes the knife into Charlie Boy. The next day, Mark dies after being impaled in a horseriding accident. Following this, Graham's film director friend Phil likewise is accidentally killed on the set of a TV commercial, when an arrow from a crossbow hits him. Graham and Sarah also learn of Scarface's death in the newspapers, and now realise that all of the people in the group photo that Graham stabbed are being killed one after the other, by a voodoo spell Graham inadvertently cast using Charlie Boy – and that the next victim will be Gwen (Frances Cuka), Uncle Jack's housekeeper, who was also in the photo. Graham is unable to remove the knife he stabbed into the fetish. He tries to contact Gwen but, after the recent deaths that have occurred at the estate, Gwen is deeply shaken. Depressed, she decides to take her own life and slashes her wrists.

To save Sarah and himself, the remaining two people in the photograph, Graham goes to Heinz Hoffman (Marius Goring), his uncle's art dealer, who first told them about Charlie Boy at the mansion. Heinz says the only way to stop the spell now is to burn the fetish. Unfortunately Graham and Sarah's house is burgled, and the fetish is stolen. It is revealed that Heinz had inadvertently given details about Charlie Boy to an old gangster friend of his, Peter Macardo, who wanted a fetish in order to deal with a rival gangster in Nigeria, and Macardo burgled Graham's house to get it. Graham goes to Macardo's home to retrieve the fetish. Sarah rushes after him to stop him, but she is killed in a car accident en route. Graham overpowers Macardo and makes away with the fetish. He returns home and starts a fire in the basement to burn it, but trips and falls onto Charlie Boy, is impaled on one of the knives protruding from it, and dies. The fire continues to burn, but the spell is already completed.

7) The Silent Scream
Chuck Spillers (Brian Cox), after serving two years for burglary, is released from prison with the help of an elderly pet shop owner Martin Blueck (Peter Cushing), who also gives him money and offers him a job in his shop. Chuck and his wife Annie (Elaine Donnelly) are thrilled with the offer.

Martin, behind his store, runs shady experiments on captured wild animals to train them to become docile, thereby avoiding the need in future to cage them and make 'cageless' zoos. The animals are kept in open cages but the exits are electrified and the animals are conditioned to eat their food only after a bell is heard. If they fail to adhere to this, they suffer an electric shock. Martin wants Chuck to manage the place for a few days while he is out of town. Chuck accepts, but unfortunately greed gets the better of him again when he sees a large safe in the shop. Despite his wife's warnings, he tries to open it, only to fall through a trapdoor into a metal cell with no exit.

When Chuck doesn't come home, Annie goes to the pet shop but Martin says he hasn't seen him. She notices Chuck's coat at the store and immediately goes to the local police but they simply advise her to wait a while longer for his return before they act. Annie investigates the store at night and finds Chuck trapped in the cell, and runs to seek help. It is revealed that Martin is a former Nazi concentration camp official conducting bizarre experiments on human beings and animals, and wanted to use Chuck as a human subject. Annie returns to help Chuck but is pushed into the cell by Martin, who closes the trapdoor. Martin observes the couple's activities and controls everything. The local police detective Aldrige (Antony Carrick) visits the store but does not find anything. Martin finds the couple's house keys in Chuck's coat, and visits their house.

As Chuck and Annie figure out what to do, an exit opens in the cell wall leading outside. However, it is electrified like all the other cages, by Martin to experiment and see if the captives will try to escape. They note that there are times when the electricity shuts off briefly. During one such moment, they rush through the exit and to freedom outside. Chuck goes back inside the store to confront Martin, but he finds that a black panther has managed to exit its cage and has cornered Martin who ends up falling into the cell himself via the trapdoor. The trapdoor closes, leaving Martin captive. Chuck and Annie return home, but on entering their house, the door shuts and the walls become electrified. Martin had wired the place during his visit and perhaps purposefully allowed them to escape as part of his experiments. The story ends with Chuck and Annie confined within their isolated house shouting desperately for help, and Martin trapped in his shop's basement—in each case, with no one to hear their screams.

8) Children of the Full Moon
Lawyer Tom Martin (Christopher Cazenove) and his wife Sarah (Celia Gregory) are heading to a country cottage for a holiday when their car breaks down in some remote Somerset woods. There they find a large house, where the housekeeper Mrs Ardoy (Diana Dors) welcomes them and offers them shelter for the night. Mrs Ardoy has many children; she says that some of them are her stepchildren, and some are fostered. She often speaks of her husband, but he is never seen. All of the children are strange - they sleep at odd times, are afraid of fire, roam the woods in the dark, and become disoriented as dusk approaches. Framed pictures of various women in the house are also seen, apparently the mothers of the various children. Tom goes back to their car to collect some things, but is attacked by a half-human creature covered in fur with yellow eyes. When he returns to the house, he and Sarah hear howling coming from the woods. Later that night in their room, Sarah is horrified when she sees the face of a werewolf at the window. Finding their bedroom door locked, Tom climbs out of the window to investigate, but falls while climbing the drainpipe. Meanwhile, the werewolf enters their bedroom through the house and attacks Sarah as Mrs Ardoy and the children watch in delight.

The following day, Tom awakens in a hospital with Sarah who tells him they were in a car crash on their way to the cottage. He asks her about the "family of werewolves" they encountered, but she laughs and tells him he must have been dreaming. However, Tom thinks it was too real to be a dream. Back home, Sarah is different. She has a voracious appetite for sex and raw steak, saying it's "delicious". Tom confides to his colleague Harry about this and the preceding experiences, and Harry agrees with him that it is unlikely it was all a dream. Weeks later, Sarah reveals she is eight weeks pregnant and the fetus is growing unnaturally rapidly. One day she leaves home and heads to the house in the Somerset woods. Mrs Ardoy and her children have already prepared for Sarah's arrival. Her portrait is already framed in the house and her room is ready for the delivery. Instinctively, Tom follows Sarah to the woods. As he begins searching for the house, he comes across a woodcutter who denies any knowledge of the house or of any supernatural creatures in the woods. However, as dusk approaches, Tom discovers the woodcutter is Mr Ardoy as he begins to change into a werewolf and kills Tom with his axe. At the house, Sarah dies during childbirth but Mrs Ardoy and the other children welcome their new baby brother into their pack.

9) Carpathian Eagle
Men are being murdered in bed by a mysterious woman with a European accent whom they pick up. Their hearts are ripped out with a curved weapon like the claw of an eagle. Suspecting a serial killer at large, Inspector Clifford (Anthony Valentine) investigates the case and learns of author Natalie Bell (Suzanne Danielle), who is writing a book about an ancient Carpathian Countess who had murdered men the same way. Natalie says she got the idea from Mrs. Henska (Siân Phillips), a middle-aged lady who claims to be the last living descendant of the notorious Countess. Mrs. Henska tells Clifford the legend of the Countess who, 300 years ago, was bestowed with an eagle from a lover that first killed her husband after he tortured her for adultery, and then she went on to kill 107 men by seducing and bringing them home.

Clifford notes that Mrs. Henska is sheltering her nephew Tader, a refugee from Poland who works as a drag artiste. Clifford questions him and Mrs. Henska, but decides they are innocent. It is then revealed that Natalie is the killer, who roams the streets in disguise in skimpy costumes looking for men who want to take her to bed and then kills them. She tries to kill another man who picks her up but fails, soon afterwards finds another potential victim in a park (Pierce Brosnan). Clifford and his colleagues suspect Natalie, and search her entire house but find nothing. Afterwards, Clifford feels sorry for suspecting Natalie and invites her to his home for the evening. Natalie accepts his apology but, now dressed as the ancient countess herself, kills Clifford in bed.

The story ends with Mrs Henska having delusions, thinking she is possessed by the Countess after the media find out about her ancestry. Meanwhile, Natalie begins researching a new book about another historical serial killer, a woman who strangled men with a velvet scarf, and prepares to begin a new killing spree.

11) Visitor from the Grave
Penny (Kathryn Leigh Scott) and Harry (Simon MacCorkindale) live in a secluded cottage. Penny is a wealthy American but has suffered a breakdown and is mentally unstable. One night when Penny is alone, she is visited by Charlie Willoughby (Stanley Lebor), who has come looking for Harry. Penny tells him to leave but when he tries to rape her, she shoots him with a rifle. Harry returns home the following morning and Penny tells him what happened. She advises going to police but Harry refuses as his rifle was unlicensed and Penny may "land back in the asylum". He buries Charlie in the woods and disposes of Charlie's Range Rover into the lake nearby, and they remove all evidence of the incident. The local policeman arrives, saying that Charlie has been missing for two days, and is questioning Harry because of a disagreement the two of them had in a pub. However, Harry dodges the cop's enquiries efficiently.

Penny's mental problems have made her reliant on medication, but Harry rations her dosage. Soon, Penny starts seeing visions of the dead Charlie wherever she goes and believes he has come back from the grave. Harry and Penny seek help from a tarot card reader named Margaret (Mia Nardi) who summons Charlie's spirit and learns that he seeks revenge. Margaret says she is not strong enough to fight Charlie, but an Indian Swami named Gupta Krishna can do it. Desperate, Penny tells Margaret to bring Gupta from India, and that she will pay him £150,000 in order to start his ashram in the UK. The Swami arrives with Margaret at the couple's house for the seance. Charlie's spirit is summoned; it appears, and is bent on revenge. Terrified and no longer able to bear the stress, Penny locks herself in the bedroom and shoots herself with the rifle.

After Penny's body is taken away by the medics, Gupta takes off his disguise, Charlie reappears in person, and they begin celebrating their "success" with Harry and Margaret. Harry and Margaret are actually lovers, Gupta and the policeman were the same person - an actor named Richard (Gareth Thomas), and Charlie never actually died. The whole thing was a set-up concocted by the four of them to grab Penny's wealth. They had arranged for Charles to attack Penny and get shot by blanks; Charles enacted his ghostly appearances with make-up, and Harry manipulated Penny's existing instability. They find the £150,000 in cash that Penny meant to pay the 'Swami' with, but as they start to divide the money, darkness befalls and Penny's ghost - a real ghost - appears before them. She vows revenge on all of them for their treachery, as the pile of money bursts into flames.

12) The Two Faces of Evil
Martin and Janet Lewis, with their son David, are driving on holiday when they give a lift to a mysterious hitchhiker in the rain, his face concealed in a raincoat. The hitchhiker grabs Martin's throat and the vehicle topples. Janet wakes up in hospital unharmed with her son, and is told that Martin underwent emergency neck surgery and cannot talk for the time being. The local policeman questions Janet, who says she can't remember anything after the crash, but that the attacker had long nails in his right hand. She is then told that the attacker was killed in the crash and his right hand is missing, hence the nails can't be seen for identification.

Still shocked, Janet takes her son and moves to another house, collects all their belongings of the crash from the hospital, and burns it in the backyard. Martin is discharged thereafter and is brought to the new house. Janet notes that Martin is acting weirdly, and he has a long nail on his right hand. This makes her suspicious about his identity and she goes to see the dead body again in the hospital. She notes this time that the dead body is that of Martin, but then is shown that the body has decayed teeth while Martin has good teeth. The doctor also tells her about doppelgangers, evil alien beings that take over the entire persona of a human being and become a lookalike but are not the same person; nevertheless, he believes that doppelgangers are only fictional.

A relieved Janet goes back to the house to Martin, but is shocked to find his teeth decayed, implying that Martin is dead and the attacker was the doppelganger who took over Martin's persona. The doppelgänger attacks Janet and David like a zombie. They run to the neighbor Mr Upity for help, where Janet hides in the stable from Martin's doppelganger, but then finds David there, who is now having decayed teeth and is a doppelganger of David. Both doppelgangers attack Janet, when Mr Upity appears on scene and Janet blacks out.

In the end it is shown that everything has quietened, Janet is being taken away by the hospital nurse in an ambulance as Martin, David and Upity bid her goodbye, and en route, Janet sees that the driver is her own doppelganger.

13) The Mark of Satan
The story opens with surgeons operating on a man's skull, during which he mutters, "Leave my soul alone" and dies. The patient is Dr Samuel Holt, a neurosurgeon himself.

Newly appointed morgue worker Edwyn Bord (Peter McEnery) becomes obsessed with the number 9, which is being often repeated to him in his everyday interactions with people and experiences. Dr. Holt's body is autopsied by Markham (Peter Birrel) and Dr Harris (Emrys James) who is very logical and jovial, with Edwyn watching and it is learnt that Holt tried drilling a hole in his skull to liberate an evil virus invading his body, which led to Subdural hemorrhage and thereafter he died during surgery for the same. Edwyn begins to think that he is being persecuted by the evil virus too as he is a good person, his suspicions supported by coincidence and confirmation bias.

Edwyn lives with his cranky-natured mother (Annie Dyson), with a pretty estranged tenant lady Stella (Georgina Hale) and her baby as their neighbour. He visits a rector, Father Macintosh (Antony Brown), for advice, but runs away when he sees 9 mentioned as the date of service. Edwyn finds that Dr Holt when alive wanted to sacrifice a baby and eat it to drive out the virus, prompted by voices in his head, but was stopped by police. Edwyn begins to think his mother is responsible for the virus and also for his father's death. He believes that Dr Holt was targeted by everyone, and since Holt died, they are targeting him as the next victim. Stella offers to help Edwyn, saying that he needs love, he should send his mother to an old age home and thereafter she will look after him. Edwyn kills his mother, and he and Stella hide her in the freezer. Father Macintosh visits the house to help Edwyn. Edwyn continues to obsess over the number 9, and develops psychosomatic symptoms. He falls into a trance-like state, and sees his colleagues Dr Harris and Markham, Stella, a psychiatrist Dr Manders (Conrad Phillips), conspiring as an evil team wanting him to eat Stella's baby for the devil's sake. Onto the scene bursts Father Macintosh with a cross, who drives away everyone and exorcises Edwyn, but is attacked by Stella like a dog.

Edwyn wakes up in the hospital, and is told by Harris and Dr Manders that he had an attack of severe delusion of persecution, and now he is better as he has responded to medication. They decide to send him back to his old job as an operation theatre assistant. Edwyn hears on the radio of three nurses who have died by a yet-undiagnosed viral infection of the brain in the country. Back home he finds Stella, but is reminded of his mother and sees her body in the freezer, after which he again develops delusions.

In the end, while working in operation theatre, Edwyn injects his scalp with local anaesthetic and drills a hole in his skull to liberate the virus, and the story ends with surgeons operating on him just as they were operating on Dr Holt in the beginning for subdural hemorrhage, as Edwyn says "Leave my soul alone".

DVD/Blu-ray release
The series was released on DVD in the UK (region 2) in October 2002 by ITV Studios. It was released as a four-disc set featuring all 13 episodes, and includes stills galleries and cast biographies as extras. The episodes are in a different order on the DVD.

In the U.S., A&E Home Entertainment, under license from Carlton International Media Limited, released the complete series on Region 1 DVD in 2001.

A re-mastered version was released in the US (region 1) on 11 September 2012 by Synapse Films. It was released as a five-disc set, and features an animated stills gallery, episode introductions from film historian Shane M. Dallman, and featurettes including Grave Recollections: A Visit With Kathryn Leigh Scott and Hammer Housekeeping: A Visit With Mia Nadasi.

Having completed a high-definition restoration of the series, the UK's Network imprint released Hammer House of Horror for the first time on HD Blu-ray in October 2017.

References

External links 

 

Hammer Film Productions
British horror fiction television series
1980 British television series debuts
1980 British television series endings
1980s British drama television series
ITV television dramas
1980s British anthology television series
1980s British television miniseries
ITV miniseries
Television series by ITC Entertainment
Television series by ITV Studios
English-language television shows